"In My Head" is a song by American rapper Lil Tjay. It was released as a single through Columbia Records and Sony Music on April 1, 2022. The song samples British singer Iyaz's 2009 debut single, "Replay". Due to sampling "Replay", Iyaz, producer J. R. Rotem, R. City duo members Timothy and Theron Thomas, and American singer-songwriters Jason Derulo and Sean Kingston are credited as songwriters alongside Tjay. "In My Head" was produced by Yoshi and Yvng Finxssa, mixed by Robbie Soukiasyan, mastered by Eric Lagg, and recorded by Barrington Hall.

Background and promotion
"In My Head" is a drill song that sees Tjay melodically rap about heartbreak from a woman not being loyal.

Music video
The official music video for "In My Head" was released alongside the song on April 1, 2022. It stars fellow American rapper Rubi Rose, who plays Tjay's love interest. It sees Tjay lying in a hospital bed and driving in a Mercedes-Benz truck.

Charts

Certifications

Release history

References

2022 singles
2022 songs
Lil Tjay songs
Songs written by Lil Tjay
Songs written by J. R. Rotem
Songs written by Timothy Thomas
Songs written by Theron Thomas
Songs written by Jason Derulo
Songs written by Sean Kingston
Sony Music singles